Byturus is a genus of fruitworm beetles in the family Byturidae. There are five described species in Byturus.

Species
 Byturus affinis Reitter, 1874
 Byturus ochraceus (Scriba, 1791)
 Byturus tomentosus (De Geer, 1774)
 Byturus unicolor Say, 1823 (raspberry fruitworm)
 Byturus wittmeri Sen Gupta

References

Further reading

External links

 

Byturidae
Articles created by Qbugbot